The Pavek Museum is a museum in St. Louis Park, Minnesota, that has one of the world's most significant collections of vintage radio and television equipment. It originated in the collection of Joe Pavek, who began collecting unique radios while he was an instructor at the Dunwoody Institute in 1946. Students then were given old radios to disassemble, and Pavek was concerned about what might be destroyed in the process.

History
Pavek's collection expanded through the 1970s, when he looked for someone to take over for him. He had difficulty finding anyone and was about to auction off the collection in 1984 when Earl Bakken stepped in. Bakken, the founder of Medtronic and the inventor of the first wearable pacemaker, had also spent many years fixing old radios and TVs, and shared Pavek's passion for vintage hardware. The two joined Paul Hedberg of the Minnesota Broadcasters Association in creating a nonprofit organization that would be the new museum's parent. The Pavek Museum opened on October 29, 1988, a day that was honored with a proclamation by Governor Rudy Perpich as "Joe Pavek Day."

Pavek died a year later, and Bakken assumed leadership of the organization. In 1990 the collection was greatly expanded with the addition of the collection of John T. "Jack" Mullin, an Army Signal Corps veteran of World War II who had brought some AEG Magnetophon tape recorders back from Germany. Mullin used them to record Bing Crosby's radio programs, the first use of magnetic tape in American broadcasting. Over the years, he acquired other recording devices and eventually amassed a world-renowned collection.

The museum has offered educational courses since its founding, both for children and adults.

Related collections
Museum of Broadcast Communications in Chicago, Illinois
Museum of Broadcast Technology in Woonsocket, Rhode Island

Minnesota Broadcasting Hall of Fame Inductees
Since 2001, the museum has honored area broadcasters by inducting them into the Minnesota Broadcasting Hall of Fame.

2001

2002

2003

2004

2005

2006

2007

2008

2009

2010

2011

2013

2015

2017

2018

2019

Notes

References 
Audio Society of Minnesota
Pavek Museum of Broadcasting
Retro Thing
St. Louis Park Historical Society
Radio World Newspaper
FedSpending

External links 
Pavek Museum of Broadcasting

1988 establishments in Minnesota
History of radio
Industry museums in Minnesota
Museums established in 1988
Museums in Hennepin County, Minnesota
Radio in Minnesota
Telecommunications museums in the United States
Television in Minnesota